Linby Colliery Football Club is a football club from Linby in Nottinghamshire, England.

They were formed in 1892 and were known as Linby Colliery Welfare for a period during the 1990s and 2000s. In 2012–13 they started playing in the Central Midlands League South Division.

Their most significant achievement was reaching the 1st round proper of the FA Cup in 1950–51. In a cup run lasting seven rounds they won 4–0 at Boston United before playing Gillingham in the first round proper. They lost to Gillingham 1–4 at home on 25 November 1950, with Linby's goal scored by Ralph 'Dickie' Dulson, father of future Port Vale star Garry Dulson.

In 1975–76 the club became founder members of the Midland County League Division One.

References

External links
 https://www.pitchero.com/clubs/linbycollierywelfare

Football clubs in Nottinghamshire
1892 establishments in England
Football clubs in England
East Midlands Regional League
Midland Football League (1889)
Central Midlands Football League
Mining association football teams in England